Stumped is a method of dismissing a batsman in cricket, which involves the wicket-keeper putting down the wicket while the batsman is out of his ground. (The batsman leaves his ground when he has moved down the pitch beyond the popping crease, usually in an attempt to hit the ball). The action of stumping can only be performed by a wicket-keeper, and can only occur from a legitimate delivery (i.e. not a no-ball), while the batsman is not attempting a run; it is a special case of a run out. 

Being "out of his ground" is defined as not having any part of the batsman's body or his bat touching the ground behind the crease – i.e., if his bat is slightly elevated from the floor despite being behind the crease, or if his foot is on the crease line itself but not completely across it and touching the ground behind it, then he would be considered out (if stumped). One of the fielding team (such as the wicket-keeper himself) must appeal for the wicket by asking the umpire. The appeal is normally directed to the square-leg umpire, who would be in the best position to adjudicate on the appeal.

Stumping
Stumping is the fifth most common form of dismissal after caught, bowled, leg before wicket and run out, though it is seen more commonly in Twenty20 cricket because of its more aggressive batting. It is governed by Law 39 of the Laws of Cricket. It is usually seen with a medium or slow bowler (in particular, a spin bowler), as with fast bowlers a wicket-keeper takes the ball too far back from the wicket to attempt a stumping. It often includes co-operation between a bowler and wicket-keeper:  the bowler draws the batsman out of his ground (such as by delivering a ball with a shorter length to make the batsman step forward to hit it on the bounce), and the wicket-keeper catches and breaks the wicket before the batsman realises he has missed the ball and makes his ground, i.e. places the bat or part of his body on the ground back behind the popping crease. If the bails are removed before the wicket-keeper has the ball, the batsman can still be stumped if the wicket-keeper removes one of the stumps from the ground, while holding the ball in his hand. The bowler is credited for the batsman's wicket, and the wicket-keeper is credited for the dismissal. A batsman may be out stumped off a wide delivery but cannot be stumped off a no ball as bowler is credited for the wicket.

Notes:
The popping crease is defined as the back edge of the crease marking (i.e. the edge closer to the wicket.  Therefore, a batsman whose bat or foot is on the crease marking, but does not touch the ground behind the crease marking, can be stumped.  This is quite common if the batsman's back foot is raised so that only his toe is on the ground.
The wicket must be properly put down in accordance with Law 29 of the Laws of cricket: using either the ball itself or a hand or arm that is in possession of the ball. Note that since the ball itself can legally put down the wicket, a stumping is still valid even if the ball merely rebounds from the 'keeper and breaks the wicket, even though never controlled by him.
The wicket-keeper must allow the ball to pass the stumps before taking it, unless it has touched either the batsman or his bat first (Law 21.9).  If the wicket-keeper fails to do this, the delivery is a "no ball", and the batsman cannot be stumped (nor run out, unless he attempts to run to the other wicket. ).

Records

MS Dhoni holds the world's fastest stumping record in cricket. He stumped out Keemo Paul of the West Indies in only 0.08 seconds.

References

External links

Cricket laws and regulations
Cricket terminology